Future Nostalgia is the fifth studio album by Canadian rock band The Sheepdogs, and serves as a follow up to the band's previous release, The Sheepdogs. The album was released on October 2, 2015 via Warner Music Canada. The album peaked at #11 on Billboard Canadian Albums Chart on October 24, 2015. The album was recorded in a cabin in Stony Lake, Ontario. The album was produced by the band instead of a "big name producer", and in an interview the band stated, "We wanted to get back to a homemade approach. [...] We wanted to be away from any scene or distraction and keep it real simple."

Reception 
Sarah Murphy of Exclaim! wrote, "the band's latest LP hears them moving forward sonically, while still throwing back the golden days of classic rock". James Christopher Monger of AllMusic compared the band to the Guess Who and Bachman–Turner Overdrive, and wrote that the album contains "expertly played Queen-style guitarmonies, stadium-ready singalongs, boogie rock backbeats, Rhodes electric piano solos, and stories about good times gone bad/bad times gone good."

Track listing
All songs written by Ewan Currie.

Personnel

The Sheepdogs
Ewan Currie – lead vocals, guitars, clarinet, bongos, Roland synth, piano
Shamus Currie – Hammond organ, piano, Wurlitzer, Farfisa, trombone, backing vocals, guitar, percussion
Ryan Gullen – bass, backing vocals, percussion
Sam Corbett – drums, backing vocals, percussion
Rusty Matyas – guitars, backing vocals, trumpet, Wurlitzer, percussion

Additional musicians
Travis Good – guitar on "Help Us All" and "Plastic Man"
Lucas Goetz – pedal steel on "Plastic Man"

Production
Matt Ross-Spang – engineering
Vance Powell – mixing
Richard Dodd – mastering
Thomas D'Arcy – engineering on "Back Down"
Mat Dunlap – artwork

References

2015 albums
The Sheepdogs albums
Warner Music Group albums